Newtro is the fifth extended play by South Korean girl group DIA. It was released digitally on March 19, 2019 and physically on March 29, 2019 by MBK Entertainment under Kakao M's music distribution. The EP includes a total of five tracks including the lead single "Woowa". Jenny did not participate in the album's recordings and promotions due to health concerns before her departure from the group on July 6, 2019.

Release
The EP was released through several music portals, including MelOn in South Korea, and iTunes for the global market.

Commercial performance 
The album debuted and peaked at number 8 on the Gaon Album Chart for the week ending March 30, 2019. Newtro spent seven consecutive weeks within the Top 40 and a total of eight weeks within the Top 100 on the chart.

The album placed at number 52 on the Gaon Album Chart for the month of March 2019 with 4,272 copies sold. It also charted at number 42 for the month of April with 5,110 additional copies sold. It has sold 10,576 copies as of May 2019.

Track listing

Charts

Release history

References

2019 EPs
DIA (group) albums
Kakao M EPs
Korean-language EPs